Willy Monty (11 October 1939 – 9 November 2014) was a Belgian racing cyclist. He competed in the team time trial at the 1960 Summer Olympics. Monty won a stage in the Dauphiné Libéré in 1964 and two stages in the Volta a Catalunya in 1965.

References

External links
 

1939 births
2014 deaths
Belgian male cyclists
Olympic cyclists of Belgium
Cyclists at the 1960 Summer Olympics
Cyclists from Hainaut (province)
People from Seneffe
20th-century Belgian people